Peter Cohen or Peter Cohn may refer to:

Peter A. Cohen, former chairman and CEO of Shearson Lehman Brothers and current chairman and CEO of Cowen Group
Peter-Adrian Cohen, American writer
Peter Cohen (director), Swedish film director, writer, editor and producer
Peter Cohn (director), American film director, writer, and producer